Old St Peter's Church a Grade II-listed ruin is situated above the B5429 in the village of Llanbedr Dyffryn Clwyd. It was first mentioned in the Lincoln Taxatio of 1291. Valued at £418 in the Valor Ecclesiasticus of 1535.

References

Llanbedr Dyffryn Clwyd, Old St Peter's
Church ruins in Wales
Grade II listed ruins in Wales